Román Emery Alza (born 5 January 1931) is a Spanish former footballer who played as a midfielder.

Career
Born in Irun, Emery played for  Logroñés and CD Málaga.

Personal life
His father Antonio, brother Juan, and nephew Unai, were also footballers.

References

1931 births
Living people
Spanish footballers
CD Logroñés footballers
CD Málaga footballers
Segunda División players
Association football midfielders
Emery family